Pul-e-Sokhta also spelled as Pule Sokhta or Puli Sokhta is neighborhood located in the western part of Kabul, Afghanistan. The Kabul River, which originates in the Paghman mountains, passes through this area. The name of this area is taken from the big bridge in the center of this area. Most of the inhabitants of this region are Hazaras and other ethnic groups live in this region. Adjacent areas of this region are Koht-e Sangi, Pul-e-Sorkh, and Sarkariz.

See also 

 Neighborhoods of Kabul

References 

Neighborhoods of Kabul